Louis Pichon (8 October 1916 – 14 October 2002) was a French modern pentathlete. He competed at the 1948 Summer Olympics.

References

1916 births
2002 deaths
French male modern pentathletes
Olympic modern pentathletes of France
Modern pentathletes at the 1948 Summer Olympics